Allied Gardens is a residential neighborhood in the eastern Navajo community of San Diego, California. It neighbors San Carlos to the east, Del Cerro to the south, the College Area to the southeast and Grantville to the southwest.

History
Allied Gardens was developed by Louis L. Kelton and Walter Bollenbacher in 1955. Their original business name was the Allied Contractors, hence the name.

Facilities
The Allied Gardens Recreation Center and Allied Gardens Pool are located on Greenbrier Avenue, next to Lewis Middle School. Further down the hill, just off Greenbrier on Estrella, are the community Little League fields. The area has a small business district located on Waring road between Orcutt and Zion, where it borders the community of Grantville. The abundance of parks and schools in the community has resulted in a very family-friendly reputation.

Businesses
Allied Gardens is primarily a family neighborhood, but does contain several businesses, service firms, and restaurants, as well as a fitness gym TruSelf Sporting Club and a new farmers market Certified Allied Gardens Sunday Market.

Education
The area is served by the San Diego Unified School District. The neighborhood contains Foster Elementary School, Marvin Elementary School, and Lewis Middle School. Older students from the area attend Patrick Henry High School, located between San Carlos and Del Cerro on Wandermere Ave.

Governance
The area is part of City Council District 7, represented by Councilman Raul Campillo. It is part of the Navajo Community Planning Area. In 2005 the City Council granted the area status as a redevelopment area.

References

External links
 Foster Elementary http://www.sandi.net/foster
 Marvin Elementary http://www.sandi.net/marvin/ 
 Patrick Henry High School http://www.sandi.net/henry
 Allied Gardens Neighborhood profile https://web.archive.org/web/20060909063548/http://www.sandiegorealestateauthority.com/san-diego/Allied-Gardens-CA.asp
 Community Site:  https://web.archive.org/web/20070604032755/http://www.alliedgardens.net/
 Community Site:  http://www.alliedgardens.com

Neighborhoods in San Diego